The Bremer Domchor (Bremen Cathedral Choir) is a mixed choir at the Protestant Bremen Cathedral in Bremen, Germany.

History 
Today's choir was founded in 1856 by Heinrich Kurth (1828–1872), the music teacher at the Domschule.

The choir has around 120 members. They perform six to eight concerts per year, also many services. Several events have been recorded or broadcast. The choir has performed in the US and Israel, and several times in France, Italy and Eastern Europe.

External links 
 
 Bremer Domchor stpetridom.de
 Götz Ruempler: Die Geschichte des Bremer Domchores

German choirs
Musical groups established in 1856